This is a list of states in the Holy Roman Empire beginning with the letter J:

References

J